Greater Pollok (Ward 3) is one of the 23 wards of Glasgow City Council. Since its creation in 2007 it has returned four council members, using the single transferable vote system.

Boundaries
Located in the south-west of Glasgow adjoining the Renfrewshire region to the west and East Renfrewshire to the south, the ward includes most of Pollok (excluding the northern Lyoncross/Templeland area north of the Levern Water which falls under Cardonald ward) as well as Priesthill, Househillwood, Darnley, Hurlet, Nitshill, South Nitshill, Jenny Lind, Parkhouse, Roughmussel, Southpark Village, Deaconsbank and the southern part of Crookston.

A 2017 boundary change removed the Arden neighbourhood which was re-assigned to the Newlands/Auldburn ward. Following these changes, it was the ward with the highest population in the city, although also covering the third-largest area.

The ethnic makeup of the Greater Pollok ward using the 2011 census population statistics was:

88.5% White Scottish / British / Irish / Other
9.8% Asian (Mainly Pakistani)
1% Black (Mainly African)
0.5% Mixed / Other Ethnic Group

Councillors

Election results

2022 election
2022 Glasgow City Council election

2017 election
2017 Glasgow City Council election

2012 election
2012 Glasgow City Council election

2007 election
2007 Glasgow City Council election

Notes

See also
Wards of Glasgow

References

External links
Listed Buildings in Greater Pollok Ward, Glasgow City at British Listed Buildings

Wards of Glasgow